The  or CPS-3 is an arcade system board that was first used by Capcom in 1996 with the arcade game Red Earth. It was the second successor to the CP System arcade hardware, following the CP System II. It would be the last proprietary system board Capcom would produce before moving on to the Dreamcast-based Naomi platform.

History
The CP System III became the final arcade system board to be designed by Capcom. It features a security mechanism; games are supplied on a CD, which contains the encrypted game contents, and a security cartridge containing the game BIOS and the SH-2 CPU with integrated decryption logic, with the per-game key stored in battery-backed SRAM. Capcom chose the CD medium in order to keep down the price of the system. When the CP System III board is first powered on, the contents of the CD are loaded into a bank of SIMMs on the motherboard, where it is executed. The program code is then decrypted at run time via the security cartridge. The security cartridge is sensitive to any sort of tampering, which will result in the decryption key being erased and the cartridge being rendered useless. Games become unplayable when the battery inside the security cartridge dies. The lone exception is Street Fighter III: 2nd Impact, which uses a default set of decryption keys that are written to dead cartridges on boot, making it the few, if not the only CPS-3 game prevalent after support was dropped, due to its immunity to cartridge suicide.

In June 2007, the encryption method was reverse-engineered by Andreas Naive, making emulation possible. Later developments led to eventual bypassing of the suicide and security routines of the games, and the development of a so-called "super cartridge" capable of running all CPS-3 games.

Specifications
 Main CPU: Hitachi HD6417099 (SH-2) at 25 MHz
 Storage:
 SCSI CD-ROM drive
 RAM (variable amount)
 Flash ROM: 8 × 16 MB
 Sound chip: 16-channel 8-bit sample player, stereo
 Maximum color palette: 16 million shades
 Maximum number of colors on screen: 32,768 (15-bit colour, 555 RGB)
 Palette size: 131,072 pens
 Colors per tile (backgrounds / sprites): 64 (6 bits per pixel) or 256 (8 bits per pixel), selectable
 Colors per tile (text overlay): 16 (4 bits per pixel)
 Maximum number of objects: 1024, with hardware scaling
 Scroll faces: 4 regular + 1 text overlay 'score screen' layer
 Scroll features: Horizontal & vertical scrolling, linescroll, linezoom
 Framebuffer zooming
 Color blending effects
 Hardware RLE decompression of 6 bpp and 8 bpp graphics through DMA
 Resolution, pixels: 384×224 (standard mode) / 496×224 (widescreen mode)

List of games
All six games are developed by Capcom and are all head-to-head fighting games in a list of games that appears to be as small as the CP System Dash library.

See also
 CP System
 CP System II

References

External links
 CPS-3 at System16: The Arcade Museum
 CPS-3 memory, suicide and SCSI information

Capcom arcade system boards
SuperH architecture